"Beautiful Thing" is a song by English rock band the Stone Roses. The track was first released on the band's YouTube channel, with a simple image of a green butterfly accompanying the track. The 12" vinyl, limited to 6,000 copies (worldwide), was released on July 22, 2016. This is their final single, prior to their second disbandment in 2017.

Reception
The track was reviewed by the Guardian as "solid, rather than earth shattering" but "a substantial improvement on its predecessor", referring to the single "All for One". They also observed it included common Stone Roses touchstones, such as references to Jesus, portions of the song reversed and guitar solos treated with wah-wah. Neil McCormick described the song as "seven minutes of splendid shuffling psychedelic monster acid rock funk" in a review for The Daily Telegraph.

Track listing
MP3 digital download
 "Beautiful Thing" – 7:02

12" vinyl single
 "Beautiful Thing" – 7:02

Neither format includes B-sides.

Personnel
Ian Brown – vocals
John Squire – guitar
Mani – bass guitar
Reni – drums and backing vocals

Charts

References

External links
The Definitive Stone Roses Discography entry

2016 songs
The Stone Roses songs
Songs written by John Squire
Songs written by Ian Brown